Oyun-Unguokhtakh ( or ) is a rural locality (a selo) in Kobyaysky Rural Okrug of Kobyaysky District in the Sakha Republic, Russia, located  from Sangar, the administrative center of the district and  from Kobyay, the administrative center of the rural okrug. It had no population as of the 2002 Census.

Geography
The village is located by the Lungkha river.

References

Notes

Sources
Official website of the Sakha Republic. Registry of the Administrative-Territorial Divisions of the Sakha Republic. Kobyaysky District. 

Rural localities in Kobyaysky District